is a Japanese manga series by Opūnokyōdai. It has been serialized online via the manga's Twitter account since July 2017 and has been collected in three tankōbon volumes by Shogakukan. An anime television series adaptation by Fanworks and Space Neko Company aired from July 3 to September 18, 2021, on the Super Animeism block. An original net animation (ONA) anime series produced by AQUA ARIS was also released from July 5, 2021.

Characters

Media

Manga

Anime
An anime television series adaptation was announced by Shogakukan on February 22, 2021. The series is co-animated by Fanworks and Space Neko Company, with Jun Aoki directing the series. It aired from July 3 to September 18, 2021, on the Super Animeism block on MBS, TBS, and BS-TBS and also started releasing on the Asmik Ace YouTube channel worldwide. Muse Communication has licensed the series in Southeast Asia and South Asia.

An original net animation (ONA) started releasing on July 5, 2021, on the Asmik Ace YouTube channel worldwide. This series is animated by AQUA ARIS, with Yoshitomo is directing the series. Muse Communication has also licensed the ONA series in Southeast Asia and South Asia and streaming this in their YouTube channel.

References

Notes

External links
Anime official website 

2021 anime ONAs
Anime series based on manga
Animeism
Comics about cats
Fanworks (animation studio)
Japanese webcomics
Muse Communication
Seinen manga
Shogakukan manga
Webcomics in print